Kavidi Wivine N'Landu is a poet and political figure from the Democratic Republic of the Congo. In 1980 she was appointed General Secretary of the Department of Women Affairs. This was during the reign of Mobutu Sese Seko.  On the rise of Laurent Kabila, she fled to South Africa. As a poet, she is noted for the collection Leurres et Lueurs.

In April 2006, she was one of the 33 candidates running in the 2006 Congolese presidential election, which took place in July 2006.

External links
UWA

Living people
Year of birth missing (living people)
Democratic Republic of the Congo women writers
20th-century Democratic Republic of the Congo women politicians
20th-century Democratic Republic of the Congo politicians
Candidates for President of the Democratic Republic of the Congo
Democratic Republic of the Congo poets
Democratic Republic of the Congo women poets
21st-century Democratic Republic of the Congo women politicians
21st-century Democratic Republic of the Congo politicians
20th-century poets
20th-century women writers
21st-century Democratic Republic of the Congo people